Medtronic, Inc. v. Lohr, 518 U.S. 470 (1996), is a United States Supreme Court case dealing with the scope of federal preemption.

It was later limited by Riegel v. Medtronic, Inc.

See also 
 Eli Lilly & Co. v. Medtronic, Inc.
 List of United States Supreme Court cases, volume 518

References

External links
 

United States Supreme Court cases
United States Supreme Court cases of the Rehnquist Court
United States federal preemption law
Medtronic litigation
1996 in United States case law